St. Joseph's Academy is a Roman Catholic secondary school in New Farm Loch, Kilmarnock, Ayrshire, Scotland. The school is located in Kilmarnock but serves the entire local authority area of East Ayrshire Council. St. Joseph's Academy is the only Roman Catholic secondary school within East Ayrshire.

History
St Joseph's Academy was founded in 1955 in its present location.  Initially built on what was the outskirts of Kilmarnock at the time, the adjacent New Farm Loch estate eventually grew and enveloped the school.

The St Joseph's campus included a large playing field, comprising a red blaze hockey pitch, running tracks, and space for 4 grass football pitches.

St. Conval's High School was later annexed with St. Joseph's in October 1998 and became known as St. Joseph's Cumnock Campus. In 2004 however St. Joseph's Cumnock Campus was shut down due to falling attendance, and the town's Catholic children now attend the new St. Joseph's Academy campus in Kilmarnock, which now serves the entire Secondary Catholic population of East Ayrshire.

In the early 21st century, a programme was initiated by the central government to upgrade secondary schools throughout the country using a mixture of public and private money.  St Joseph's was one of the schools selected for demolition and reconstruction, along with nearby Grange Academy.

On 17 September 2008, the rebuilt St Joseph's was opened, including the new St Andrew's Primary - an amalgamation of the former feeder St Columba's and St Matthew's Primaries.

The current Head Teacher, Mr. Joseph Kane, took up the post in February 2018.

Primary schools
Currently, the school takes its pupils from the local Catholic primary schools, not just from Kilmarnock but the surrounding towns and villages. These schools are:

St. Andrew's in Kilmarnock
Mount Carmel in Kilmarnock
St. Sophia's in Galston
St. Patrick's in Auchinleck
St. Xavier's in Patna

External links
St Joseph's Academy Website
St Joseph's Academy East Ayrshire council page
HM Inspectorate of Education - Saint Joseph’s Academy, Kilmarnock, East Ayrshire Council. 18 December 2007

Catholic secondary schools in East Ayrshire
Educational institutions established in 1955
Kilmarnock
1955 establishments in Scotland